Cheraghlu (also Romanized as Cherāghlū; also known as Chanaglu, Charaglu, and Cherāqlū) is a village in Ozomdel-e Jonubi Rural District, in the Central District of Varzaqan County, East Azerbaijan Province, Iran. At the 2006 census, its population was 104, in 22 families.

References 

Towns and villages in Varzaqan County